Miloš Isakov Kovačević (born 15 June 1989) is a Serbian professional basketball coach for Vojvodina of the Basketball League of Serbia.

Early life and education 
Isakov Kovačević earned his degree in medicine from the University of Novi Sad. In October 2020, the College of Sports and Health in Belgrade awarded their best students, including Isakov Kovačević.

Coaching career 
Isakov Kovačević started his coaching career with Mladost Veternik. In August 2020, Isakov Kovačević joined Vojvodina as an assistant coach. On 15 June 2022, Vojvodina hired Isakov Kovačević as their new head coach.

National team coaching career 
In July/August 2019, Isakov Kovačević was an assistant coach for Serbia national under-18 team at the FIBA U18 European Championship in Volos, Greece.

In February 2022, Serbia national team head coach Svetislav Pešić added Isakov Kovačević as a scout to his coaching staff. He left the position in August 2022.

In July 2022, Isakov Kovačević was the head coach for the Serbia national under-15 team that finished 7th at the European Youth Olympic Festival in Banská Bystrica, Slovakia.

References

External links
 Coach Profile at eurobasket.com

1989 births
Living people
KK Vojvodina coaches
Serbian basketball scouts
Serbian men's basketball coaches
Serbian physicians
Sportspeople from Novi Sad
University of Novi Sad alumni